Girolamo Maccabei de Toscanella (died 1574) was a Roman Catholic prelate who served as Bishop of Castro del Lazio (1543-1568).

Biography
On 6 July 1543, Girolamo Maccabei de Toscanella was appointed during the papacy of Pope Paul III as Bishop of Castro del Lazio. He served as Bishop of Castro del Lazio until his resignation in 1568. He died in 1574.

Episcopal succession
While bishop, he was the principal consecrator of: 
Girolamo Dandini, Bishop of Caserta (1545); 
Giovanni Giacomo Barba, Bishop of Teramo (1546); and 
Romolo Cesi, Bishop of Narni (1566);

and the principal co-consecrator of: 
Giovanni Battista Castagna, Archbishop of Rossano; and 
Egidio Valenti, Bishop of Nepi e Sutri.

References 

16th-century Italian Roman Catholic bishops
Bishops appointed by Pope Paul III
1574 deaths